The 1976 Florida State Seminoles football team represented Florida State University during the 1976 NCAA Division I football season. It marked the first season for Bobby Bowden as coach.

Schedule

Personnel

Season summary

Florida

References

Florida State
Florida State Seminoles football seasons
Florida State Seminoles football